Juan Meza (born March 18, 1956), also known for his nickname Kid Meza, is a Mexican former professional boxer who was world Super Bantamweight champion. Meza was born in Mexicali, Mexico.

Short biography
Mesa was born Jesus Fernández. Prior to beginning his career, and for undisclosed reasons, he changed his name officially to Juan Meza.

Meza was a popular fighter among Latin Americans, specially those of Mexican descent who lived in North America. His trainer was the well known boxing personality, Jimmy Montoya.

Professional career
Juan Meza debuted on September 23, 1977, knocking out Elias Rodriguez in three rounds at Tucson.

He lost for the first time on his second bout, being beaten on points after four rounds by Valentin Holguin on October 13 in Los Angeles. Six days later, he knocked out Davey White in Las Vegas. Eight days later, he had a rematch with Holguin, over the extremely rare five rounds schedule distance. He avenged his first loss by outpointing Holguin.

On November 3, he scored his first knockout in the first round, defeating Horacio Pintado in Los Angeles. But, in his next fight, on November 18, he lost by a four-round decision to Carlos Ortiz, in San Diego.

Meza began rising in boxing's ranks when he knocked Ortiz out in the first round on December 16, also at San Diego. He won 29 of his next 31 bouts, earning fame, particularly in the West Coast of the United States.

Meza got his first world championship try, when he faced Gómez in Atlantic City, for the WBC world Super Bantamweight title. Meza lost to Gómez by a sixth-round knockout.

After losing to Gómez, Mesa took off one year from boxing. During this time, Gómez left the championship vacant; to challenge for the WBC's world Featherweight championship, and Jaime Garza won it by knocking out Bobby Berna for the vacant championship.

Meanwhile, Meza returned to boxing on April 26, 1983, knocking out Roberto Castillo in four rounds at Las Vegas.

He traveled to Thailand during July of that year, to fight Pongpan Sorphayathai on the 13th. of that month. He beat the Thai fighter by a third-round knockout.

On November 19, he fought Javier Barajas in Las Vegas, beating Barajas by a ten-round decision. The pair had a rematch, on May 16, 1984 in Las Vegas, and Meza won once again, by a ten-round decision. After that, he was ranked as the number one Super Bantamweight challenger once again by the WBC.

On November 3, he was given a second try at the championship when he faced Garza, in Kingston, New York. Meza became the first challenger in boxing history to be dropped in round one, get up and knock the world champion out in the same first round, when he beat Garza to become the WBC world Super Bantamweight champion that day.

On April 19, 1985 he and Julio César Chávez co-starred in an undercard, defending their world championships against Mike Ayala and Ruben Castillo, respectively, at the Inglewood Forum, in Inglewood, California. Both champions retained their titles with sixth-round knockout wins.

On August 18, he and Lupe Pintor squared off in a fight that garnered major interest among Mexican boxing fans. Meza lost his title in Tijuana that night, when Pintor dropped him twice, outpointing him over twelve rounds.

Pintor lost his title, in turn, to Samart Payakaroon, who gave Meza a chance to recover the WBC world Super Bantamweight championship on December 10, 1986 in Bangkok. Despite not fighting for more than a year, Meza lasted until the twelfth round with Payakaroon, who proceeded to knock him out in that round.

Meza had two fights in 1987, beating Lenny Valdez in the first round by knockout, and then losing to Javier Marquez by a knockout in round eight on October 30. After his fight with Marquez, he retired for ten years.

On February 14, 1997, he returned to boxing with a knockout victory, beating Esteban Lozoya in four rounds at Mexicali. But, in his next fight, he met fringe contender Wilfredo Negron of Puerto Rico, being knocked out by the Puerto Rican in the first round at Miami. Meza then retired for the second time.

Professional boxing record

See also
List of world super-bantamweight boxing champions
List of Mexican boxing world champions

References

External links

 

1956 births
Living people
Mexican male boxers
Boxers from Baja California
Sportspeople from Mexicali
Super-bantamweight boxers
World super-bantamweight boxing champions
World Boxing Council champions